La Paz is a small town in the province of Córdoba, Argentina.

The town grew around a Catholic church, San Juan de las Talas, built there in 1720, during colonial times.

Economy 
The main activity is tourism and the production of medical vegetables. One of its tourist attractions is Cerro Loma Bola (Loma Bola Hill), the Piedra Blanca stream, and wide native woods, as well as its local gastronomy.

Each August 29 the town celebrates the Virgen de la Merced.

References

Populated places in Córdoba Province, Argentina
Tourism in Argentina